Lesli Linka Glatter (born July 26, 1953) is an American film and television director. She is best known for her work on the AMC drama series Mad Men and the Showtime series Homeland, for which she's received eight Primetime Emmy Award nominations. She's also received an Academy Award for Best Live Action Short Film nomination for Tales of Meeting and Parting (1985).

Life and career
Glatter was born in Dallas and began her career as a dancer and choreographer. Her early choreography credits include William Friedkin's To Live and Die in L.A and the music video for Sheila E.'s "The Glamorous Life".

Her first film, Tales of Meeting and Parting (1984), produced by Sharon Oreck, was nominated for an Academy Award in the Live Action Short Film category. She made the film as part of the American Film Institute Directing Workshop for Women, of which she is an alumna.

In 1995, Glatter directed her first feature film, Now and Then, a coming-of-age story about four 12-year-old girls during an eventful summer in 1970.

She has made several television films for cable networks, but the majority of her work is in television series. Glatter has received five nominations for the Primetime Emmy Award for Outstanding Directing for a Drama Series, for the Mad Men episode "Guy Walks Into an Advertising Agency" (2009), and the Homeland episodes "Q&A" (2012), "From A to B and Back Again" (2014) and "The Tradition of Hospitality" (2015) and "America First" (2016).

In 2018 it was announced that Glatter would serve as chair on the advisory council for NBC's Female Forward. An annual initiative to give ten women directors the opportunity to shadow a director on one of NBC's scripted television series for up to three episodes. The experience concludes with an in-season commitment for each finalist to direct at least one episode of the series they shadow.

On February 5, 2019, it was announced that Glatter will be credited as an executive producer alongside Bruna Papandrea and Charlotte Stoudt in the upcoming Netflix thriller series, Pieces of Her. More recently, she and Cheryl Bloch launched Backyard Pictures with a first look deal at Universal Television.

In 2021, Glatter was elected president of the Directors Guild of America.

Lesli Linka Glatter is currently the Executive Producer/Director of Love and Death, an HBO limited series written by David E. Kelley and starring Elizabeth Olsen and Jesse Plemons. It airs in April 2023.

Partial filmography
Tales of Meeting and Parting (with Sharon Oreck) (1984) (short) (nominated for an Academy Award)
Amazing Stories (1986) (TV)
Brewster Place (1990) (TV)
Twin Peaks (1990–1991) (TV)
On the Air (1992) (TV)
Black Tie Affair (1992) (TV)
Birdland (1994) (TV)
NYPD Blue (1994) (TV)
Now and Then (1995)
Murder One (1996) (TV)
Brooklyn South (1998) (TV)
Buddy Faro (1998) (TV)
The Proposition (1998)
Law & Order: Special Victims Unit (1999–2001) (TV)
Citizen Baines (2000) (TV)
Freaks and Geeks (2000) (TV)
Gilmore Girls (2000–2001) (TV)
Third Watch (2001) (TV)
Presidio Med (2002) (TV)
 "Keeping Last" (2004) (music video)
The O.C. (2005) (TV)
Numb3rs (2005) (TV)
Jonny Zero (2005) (TV)
Revelations (2005) (TV)
Grey's Anatomy (2005) (TV)
The West Wing (2002–2006) (TV)
Heroes (2007) (TV)
Swingtown (2008) (TV)
The Starter Wife (2008) (TV)
ER (1995–2008) (TV)
The Unit (2009) (TV)
Weeds (2009) (TV)
The Mentalist (2009) (TV)
House M.D. (2007–2009) (TV)
Mad Men (2007–2010) (TV)
The Good Wife (2010) (TV)
Lie to Me (2010) (TV)
Pretty Little Liars (2010–2012) (TV)
The Chicago Code (2011) (TV)
True Blood (2011) (TV)
The Newsroom (2012) (TV)
Homeland (2012–2020) (TV)
Six (2017) (TV)
The Morning Show (2021) (TV)
Pieces of Her (2022) (TV)

Awards
2016: Dorothy Arzner Directors Award winner

References

External links
 
 

1953 births
Living people
20th-century American Jews
20th-century American women
21st-century American Jews
21st-century American women
American television directors
American women film directors
American women television directors
Directors Guild of America Award winners
Film directors from Texas
Greenhill School alumni
People from Dallas